Villa Joseph Marie High School is a private Roman Catholic all-girls high school in Holland, Pennsylvania.

Background
Villa Joseph Marie High School was established in 1932 by the Sisters of Saint Casimir.

The school began as a small boarding school with the students living in Regina Hall and attending classes in Maria Hall.  In 1957, the current school building was completed and Villa became a traditional day school.

Notable alumnae
 Martina White, Pennsylvania State Representative
 Jo Piazza, Author

Notes and references

External links
 School Website

Catholic secondary schools in Pennsylvania
Educational institutions established in 1932
Girls' schools in Pennsylvania
Schools in Bucks County, Pennsylvania
1932 establishments in Pennsylvania